NEVER was a series of professional wrestling events held by New Japan Pro-Wrestling (NJPW) between August 2010 and November 2012. On July 12, 2010, NJPW officially announced the NEVER project, which was to highlight younger up-and-coming talent and outside wrestlers not signed to the promotion. It was explained that the name of the project was an acronym of the terms "New Blood", "Evolution", "Valiantly", "Eternal" and "Radical". For the events, NJPW recruited several freelancers as well as wrestlers signed to promotions such as DDT Pro-Wrestling and Kaientai Dojo. Some outsiders who became NEVER regulars included Daisuke Sasaki, Kaji Tomato, Madoka, Ryuichi Sekine and Shinobu. Kushida, who entered NEVER as a representative of the Smash promotion in February 2011, signed a NJPW contract the following month and returned to the project the following September, now representing NJPW. Three NJPW trainees; Hiromu Takahashi, Sho Tanaka and Yohei Komatsu, made their professional wrestling debuts at NEVER events. Takahashi, who debuted at NEVER.1, was the only wrestler who wrestled on all thirteen NEVER events.

On October 5, 2012, NJPW announced that NEVER was going to get its own championship, the NEVER Openweight Championship. The title was originally scheduled to be defended exclusively at NEVER events, but this plan was quickly changed and since its foundation, the title has been defended on the undercards of NJPW events. NJPW has not held a single NEVER event since the tournament, which crowned the first NEVER Openweight Champion on November 19, 2012. A second NEVER title, the NEVER Openweight 6-Man Tag Team Championship, was announced on December 21, 2015, with the first champions crowned on January 4, 2016.

On July 18, 2015, NJPW announced "Lion's Gate", a project with a theme similar to NEVER, which held its first show on February 25, 2016.

NEVER championships

Events

NEVER.1

The first NEVER event was held on August 24, 2010, in Tokyo at Shin-Kiba 1st Ring. The event featured five matches, which involved six outsiders; Taishi Takizawa from Kaientai Dojo, Kazuhiro Tamura from Style-E, Yusuke Kodama from Smash, Shinobu from 666 and freelancers Osamu Namiguchi and Madoka. The opening match of the event featured the professional wrestling debut of Hiromu Takahashi.

NEVER.2

The second NEVER event was held on September 16, 2010, in Osaka at the Sekaikan theater. The event featured five matches, which involved five outsiders; Takuya Tomakomai from Dragon Gate, Daisuke Harada and Tadasuke from Osaka Pro Wrestling and freelancers Yohei Nakajima and Yosuke Takii.

NEVER.3

The third NEVER event was held on October 8, 2010, in Tokyo at Shin-Kiba 1st Ring. The event featured six matches, which involved seven outsiders; Keisuke Ishii from DDT Pro-Wrestling, Keita Yano from Battlarts, Shinobu from 666, Kaji Tomato and Taishi Takizawa from Kaientai Dojo and freelancers Daisuke Sasaki and Madoka.

NEVER.4

The fourth NEVER event was held on November 18, 2010, in Tokyo at Shin-Kiba 1st Ring. The event featured six matches, which involved six outsiders; Keisuke Ishii from DDT Pro-Wrestling, Jun Ogawauchi from Secret Base, Shinobu from 666 and freelancers Antonio Honda, Madoka and Daisuke Sasaki. The event featured Hiroyoshi Tenzan's return match, after being sidelined for fifteen months with a back injury.

NEVER.5

The fifth NEVER event was held on February 24, 2011, in Tokyo at Shin-Kiba 1st Ring. The event featured seven matches, which involved six outsiders; Kazuki Hirata from DDT Pro-Wrestling, Shigehiro Irie from Team Dera, Shinobu from 666, Kushida from Smash and freelancers Daisuke Sasaki and Madoka. In the opening match, Hiromu Takahashi, six months after his debut match, picked up his first professional wrestling win over Hirata.

NEVER.6: Road to the Super Jr. 2Days Tournament

The sixth NEVER event, subtitled "Road to the Super Jr. 2Days Tournament", was held over two days on April 7 and 8, 2011, in Tokyo at Shin-Kiba 1st Ring. During the events, NJPW held two single-elimination tournaments, with both winners earning spots in the 2011 Best of the Super Juniors tournament. Both events featured eight matches and thirteen outsiders; Kazuki Hirata, Keisuke Ishii, Ken Ohka and Shinichiro Tominaga from DDT Pro-Wrestling / Union Pro Wrestling, Kaji Tomato, Marines Mask and Ryuichi Sekine from Kaientai Dojo, Shinobu from 666, Kazuhiro Tamura from Style-E and freelancers Daisuke Sasaki, Madoka, Osamu Namiguchi and Tsuyoshi Kikuchi.

April 7

April 8

Road to the Super Jr. 2Days Tournament A

Road to the Super Jr. 2Days Tournament B

NEVER.7: Go to the Next Level

The seventh NEVER event, subtitled "Go to the Next Level", was held on September 21, 2011, in Osaka at the Sekaikan theater. The event featured six matches and for the first time included no outsiders.

NEVER.8: Go to the Next Level

The eighth NEVER event, also subtitled "Go to the Next Level", was held on February 10, 2012, in Osaka at the Sekaikan theater. The event featured seven matches, which involved one outsider; freelancer Shoichi Uchida. The event featured King Fale's farewell match, before going on an overseas learning excursion.

NEVER.9: Road to the Super Jr. 2Days Tournament 1st.

NEVER.9: Road to the Super Jr. 2Days Tournament 1st. was held on April 13, 2012, in Tokyo at Shin-Kiba 1st Ring. The event saw the start of a single-elimination tournament, where the winner would earn a spot in the 2012 Best of the Super Juniors tournament. The event featured six matches, which involved six outsiders; Hiro Tonai, Kaji Tomato and Ryuichi Sekine from Kaientai Dojo, Yusuke Kodama from Wrestling New Classic (WNC) and freelancers Black Tiger and Madoka.

NEVER.9: Road to the Super Jr. 2Days Tournament Final

NEVER.9: Road to the Super Jr. 2Days Tournament Final was held on April 15, 2012, in Tokyo at Shin-Kiba 1st Ring. The event featured the semifinals and finals of a single-elimination tournament, where the winner would earn a spot in the 2012 Best of the Super Juniors tournament. The event featured six matches, which involved six outsiders; Hiro Tonai, Kaji Tomato and Ryuichi Sekine from Kaientai Dojo, Yusuke Kodama from Wrestling New Classic (WNC) and freelancers Black Tiger and Madoka. The winner of the tournament, Black Tiger, never entered the 2012 Best of the Super Juniors, as on May 25 NJPW publicly fired the character's performer Kazushige Nosawa, a day after he had been arrested under suspicion of smuggling cannabis.

Road to the Super Jr. 2Days Tournament

NEVER: Inaugural NEVER Openweight Championship Tournament 1st Round

NEVER: Inaugural NEVER Openweight Championship Tournament 1st Round was held on November 15, 2012, in Tokyo at Shibuya-AX. The event featured the start of a tournament to determine the inaugural NEVER Openweight Champion. The event featured nine matches, which involved six outsiders; Hiro Tonai, Kengo Mashimo, Ryuichi Sekine, Shiori Asahi and Taishi Takizawa from Kaientai Dojo and freelancer Daisuke Sasaki. Technically, Masato Tanaka was an outsider, being signed to Pro Wrestling Zero1, but due to having been a regular for NJPW for several years, he was co-billed as a representative of the NJPW stable Chaos. The opening match of the event saw the professional wrestling debut of Sho Tanaka.

NEVER: Inaugural NEVER Openweight Championship Tournament Final

NEVER: Inaugural NEVER Openweight Championship Tournament Final was held on November 19, 2012, in Tokyo at Shibuya-AX. The event featured the second round, semifinals and finals of a tournament to determine the inaugural NEVER Openweight Champion. The event featured ten matches, involving the same wrestlers who had taken part in the "1st Round" event four days earlier. The opening match of the event saw the professional wrestling debut of Yohei Komatsu. In the main event of the show, Masato Tanaka defeated Karl Anderson to win the tournament and become the first NEVER Openweight Champion. NJPW has not held a single NEVER event since.

NEVER Openweight Championship tournament

See also
New Japan Pro-Wrestling
Lion's Gate Project

References

External links
The official New Japan Pro-Wrestling website

New Japan Pro-Wrestling shows
2010 in professional wrestling
2011 in professional wrestling
2012 in professional wrestling
Entertainment events in Japan